The Lisbon Post Office  in Lisbon, North Dakota, United States, is a post office building that was built in 1939.  It was listed on the National Register of Historic Places in 1989 as U.S. Post Office-Lisbon.

References

Government buildings completed in 1939
Post office buildings on the National Register of Historic Places in North Dakota
National Register of Historic Places in Ransom County, North Dakota
Lisbon, North Dakota